Bohunka Šrámková, also known as Muki Bolton, (born 8 October 1946) is a Czech former pair skater who represented Czechoslovakia. With her brother, Jan Šrámek, she is the 1968 Winter Universiade champion and 1967 Czechoslovak national champion. The pair placed tenth at the 1968 Winter Olympics in Grenoble, France. They also finished in the top ten at three ISU Championships – 1967 European Championships in Ljubljana, Yugoslavia; 1967 World Championships in Vienna, Austria; and 1968 World Championships in Geneva, Switzerland.

Earlier in her career, Šrámková competed in ladies' singles, winning two national bronze medals. She was an attaché for the Czech delegation at the 2002 Winter Olympics in Salt Lake City.

Competitive highlights

Pairs with Šrámek

Ladies' singles

References 

1946 births
Czech female pair skaters
Czechoslovak female pair skaters
Figure skaters at the 1968 Winter Olympics
Living people
Olympic figure skaters of Czechoslovakia
Sportspeople from Ostrava
Universiade medalists in figure skating
Universiade gold medalists for Czechoslovakia
Competitors at the 1968 Winter Universiade